Dingbian Road, formerly known as Cao'an Highway, is a station that is part of Line 14 of the Shanghai Metro. Located at Dingbian Road and Tongchuan Road in the city's Jiading District, the station is scheduled to opened with the rest of Line 14 on December 30, 2021.

References 

Railway stations in Shanghai
Shanghai Metro stations in Jiading District
Line 14, Shanghai Metro
Railway stations in China opened in 2021